Kenneth Joseph Arrow (23 August 1921 – 21 February 2017) was an American economist, mathematician, writer, and political theorist. He was the joint winner of the Nobel Memorial Prize in Economic Sciences with John Hicks in 1972.

In economics, he was a major figure in post-World War II neo-classical economic theory. Many of his former graduate students have gone on to win the Nobel Memorial Prize themselves. His most significant works are his contributions to social choice theory, notably "Arrow's impossibility theorem", and his work on general equilibrium analysis. He has also provided foundational work in many other areas of economics, including endogenous growth theory and the economics of information.

Education and early career
Arrow was born on 23 August 1921, in New York City. Arrow's mother, Lilian (Greenberg), was from Iași, Romania, and his father, Harry Arrow, was from nearby Podu Iloaiei. The Arrow family were Romanian Jews. His family was very supportive of his education. Growing up during the Great Depression, he embraced socialism in his youth. He would later move away from socialism, but his views retained a left-leaning philosophy.

He graduated from Townsend Harris High School and then earned a Bachelor's degree from the City College of New York in 1940 in mathematics, where he was a member of Sigma Phi Epsilon.  He then attended Columbia University for graduate studies, obtaining a Master's degree in mathematics in June 1941.  While there, Arrow studied under Harold Hotelling, who influenced him to change fields to economics. He served as a weather officer in the United States Army Air Forces from 1942 to 1946.

Academic career
From 1946 to 1949 Arrow spent his time partly as a graduate student at Columbia and partly as a research associate at the Cowles Commission for Research in Economics at the University of Chicago. During that time he also held the rank of Assistant Professor in Economics at the University of Chicago and worked at the RAND Corporation in California. He left Chicago to take up the post of Acting Assistant Professor of Economics and Statistics at Stanford University. In 1951, he earned his PhD from Columbia. He served in the government on the staff of the Council of Economic Advisers in the 1960s with Robert Solow. In 1968, he left Stanford for the position of Professor of Economics at Harvard University. It was during his tenure there that he received the Nobel Prize in Economics.

Arrow returned to Stanford in 1979 and became the Joan Kenney Professor of Economics and Professor of Operations Research. He retired in 1991. As a Fulbright Distinguished Chair, in 1995 he taught Economics at the University of Siena. He was also a founding member of the Pontifical Academy of Social Sciences and a member of the Science Board of Santa Fe Institute. At various stages in his career he was a Fellow of Churchill College, Cambridge.
He was one of the founding editors of the Annual Review of Economics, which was first published in 2009.

Four of his former students have gone on to become Nobel Prize winners, namely John Harsanyi, Eric Maskin, Roger Myerson and Michael Spence. A collection of Arrow's papers is housed at the Rubenstein Library at Duke University.

Arrow's impossibility theorem

Arrow's monograph Social Choice and Individual Values derives from his 1951 PhD thesis.

In what he named the General Impossibility Theorem, he theorized that, unless we accept to compare the levels of utility reached by different individuals, it is impossible to formulate a social preference ordering that satisfies all of the following conditions:

 Nondictatorship: The preferences of an individual should not become the group ranking without considering the preferences of others.
 Individual Sovereignty: each individual should be able to order the choices in any way and indicate ties
 Unanimity: If every individual prefers one choice to another, then the group ranking should do the same
 Freedom From Irrelevant Alternatives: If a choice is removed, then the others' order should not change
 Uniqueness of Group Rank: The method should yield the same result whenever applied to a set of preferences.  The group ranking should be transitive.

The theorem has implications for welfare economics and theories of justice, and for voting theory (it extends the Condorcet paradox). Following Arrow's logical framework, Amartya Sen formulated the liberal paradox which argued that given a status of "Minimal Liberty" there was no way to obtain Pareto optimality, nor to avoid the problem of social choice of neutral but unequal results.

General equilibrium theory

Work by Arrow and Gérard Debreu and simultaneous work by Lionel McKenzie offered the first rigorous proofs of the existence of a market clearing equilibrium. For this work and his other contributions, Debreu won the 1983 Nobel Prize in Economics. Arrow went on to extend the model and its analysis to include uncertainty, the stability. His contributions to the general equilibrium theory were strongly influenced by Adam Smith's Wealth of Nations. Written in 1776, The Wealth of Nations is an examination of economic growth brought forward by the division of labor, by ensuring interdependence of individuals within society.

In 1974, The American Economic Association published the paper written by Kenneth Arrow, General Economic Equilibrium: Purpose, Analytic Techniques, Collective Choice, where he states:

Fundamental theorems of welfare economics
In 1951, Arrow presented the first and second fundamental theorems of welfare economics and their proofs without requiring differentiability of utility, consumption, or technology, and including corner solutions.

Endogenous-growth theory

Arrow was one of the precursors of endogenous growth theory, which seeks to explain the source of technical change, which is a key driver of economic growth. Until this theory came to prominence, technical change was assumed to occur exogenously — that is, it was assumed to occur outside economic activities, and was outside (exogenous) to common economic models. At the same time there was no economic explanation for why it occurred. Endogenous-growth theory provided standard economic reasons for why firms innovate, leading economists to think of innovation and technical change as determined by economic actors, that is endogenously to economic activities, and thus belong inside the model. Endogenous growth theory started with Paul Romer's 1986 paper, borrowing from Arrow's 1962 "learning-by-doing" model which introduced a mechanism to eliminate diminishing returns in aggregate output. A literature on this theory has developed subsequently to Arrow's work.

Information economics
In other pioneering research, Arrow investigated the problems caused by asymmetric information in markets. In many transactions, one party (usually the seller) has more information about the product being sold than the other party. Asymmetric information creates incentives for the party with more information to cheat the party with less information; as a result, a number of market structures have developed, including warranties and third party authentication, which enable markets with asymmetric information to function. Arrow analysed this issue for medical care (a 1963 paper entitled "Uncertainty and the Welfare Economics of Medical Care", in the American Economic Review); later researchers investigated many other markets, particularly second-hand assets, online auctions and insurance.

Awards and honors
Arrow was awarded the John Bates Clark Medal in 1957 and was elected a Fellow of the American Academy of Arts and Sciences in 1959. In 1968, he was elected to both the United States National Academy of Sciences and the American Philosophical Society. He was the joint winner of the Nobel Memorial Prize in Economics with John Hicks in 1972 and the 1986 recipient of the von Neumann Theory Prize. He was one of the recipients of the 2004 National Medal of Science, the nation's highest scientific honor, presented by President George W. Bush for his contributions to research on the problem of making decisions using imperfect information and his research on bearing risk.

He has received honorary doctorates from the University of Chicago (1967), the University of Vienna (1971) the City University of New York (1972). On 2 June 1995 he received an honorary doctorate from the Faculty of Social Sciences at Uppsala University, Sweden. He was elected a Foreign Member of the Royal Society (ForMemRS) in 2006.
He was elected to the 2002 class of Fellows of the Institute for Operations Research and the Management Sciences.

Personal life and death
Arrow was a brother to the economist Anita Summers, uncle to economist and former Treasury Secretary and Harvard President Larry Summers, and brother-in-law of the late economists Robert Summers and Paul Samuelson. In 1947, he married Selma Schweitzer, graduate in economics at the University of Chicago and psychotherapist, who died in 2015; they had two children, David Michael (b. 1962), an actor, and Andrew Seth (b. 1965), an actor/singer.

Arrow was well known for being a polymath, possessing prodigious knowledge of subjects far removed from economics. On one occasion (recounted by Eric Maskin), in an attempt to artificially test Arrow's knowledge, the junior faculty agreed to closely study the breeding habits of gray whales — a suitably obscure topic — and discuss it in his presence. To their surprise, Arrow already was familiar with the work they had studied and, in addition, thought it had been refuted by other research.

Arrow died in his Palo Alto, California home on 21 February 2017 at the age of 95.

Publications 

 
 
Reprinted as: 
 
 
Also available as: 
and as: 
 
 
 
 
 
Including: Arrow, Kenneth J. Price-quantity adjustments in multiple markets with rising demands, pp. 3–15.
 
 
 
 
Reprinted as: 
Also reprinted as a pdf.
 
 
 
 
 
Reprinted as: 
 
 :

 
  Book details.
 
 
 
Also available online as: 
 
Also available online as:

Further reading
 Eric S. Maskin. 2019. "The Economics of Kenneth J. Arrow: A Selective Review." Annual Review of Economics

See also
 Arrow information paradox
 List of economists
 List of Jewish Nobel laureates
 List of think tanks

References

External links

 Collected Papers of Kenneth J. Arrow
 Biography of Kenneth J. Arrow from the Institute for Operations Research and the Management Sciences
 
Kenneth Arrow: An Oral History, Stanford Historical Society Oral History Program, 2011
Kenneth J. Arrow: An Oral History, Stanford Historical Society Oral History Program, 2016

1921 births
2017 deaths
Nobel laureates in Economics
American Nobel laureates
Jewish American writers
Jewish American economists
20th-century American economists
21st-century American male writers
21st-century American economists
American economics writers
American people of Romanian-Jewish descent
American political philosophers
American political writers
American social democrats 
City College of New York alumni
Columbia Graduate School of Arts and Sciences alumni
Writers from Queens, New York
Military personnel from New York City
United States Army Air Forces officers
Fellows of the American Academy of Arts and Sciences
Fellows of the American Statistical Association
Fellows of the Econometric Society
Foreign Members of the Royal Society
Welfare economists
Game theorists
General equilibrium theorists
Intergovernmental Panel on Climate Change lead authors
Jewish American scientists
John von Neumann Theory Prize winners
Mathematical economists
Members of the Pontifical Academy of Social Sciences
Members of the United States National Academy of Sciences
Foreign Members of the Russian Academy of Sciences
National Medal of Science laureates
Presidents of the Econometric Society
RAND Corporation people
Stanford University Department of Economics faculty
Townsend Harris High School alumni
University of Chicago faculty
Voting theorists
Presidents of the American Economic Association
Santa Fe Institute people
Distinguished Fellows of the American Economic Association
Fellows of the Institute for Operations Research and the Management Sciences
21st-century American non-fiction writers
American male non-fiction writers
Mathematicians from New York (state)
Economists from New York (state)
Nancy L. Schwartz Memorial Lecture speakers
United States Army Air Forces personnel of World War II
Corresponding Fellows of the British Academy
Annual Reviews (publisher) editors
Members of the National Academy of Medicine
Members of the American Philosophical Society